Schizodon knerii is a fish in the family Anostomidae from South America.

Named in honor of ichthyologist Rudolf Kner (1810-1869), who studied anostomid fishes.  Kner was describer Steindachner’s teacher and friend.

Description
Schizodon knerii can grow to  standard length.

Distribution
Schizodon knerii is endemic to the São Francisco River basin, Brazil.

References

Anostomidae
Fish of the São Francisco River basin
Endemic fauna of Brazil
Taxa named by Franz Steindachner
Fish described in 1875